Clifford David (June 30, 1928 – November 30, 2017) was an American actor, singer, and coach. His career began in the 1950s, with early live television appearances leading to roles in Broadway musicals. He also played character roles in television series, feature films, and theatre. He is most recognized for his singing performances on several original Broadway cast albums.

Early life
David was born in Toledo, Ohio, the youngest son of Farris and Lily (née Abdow). His uncle was Metropolitan archdiocese Samuel David of Toledo, the archbishop of a diocese of Syrian Orthodox parishes. Samuel David's chanting of the Byzantine mass was world-renowned, and Clifford, inspired by his uncle's voice, went to New York City to pursue music and theater.

Career
A protégé of Lee Strasberg, David made his Broadway debut as Scipio in Albert Camus' Caligula directed by Sidney Lumet. He also played Pasquale in The Aspern Papers, directed by Margaret Webster, Antipholus in the 1963 Off-Broadway revival The Boys from Syracuse, Laertes in Joseph Papp's Hamlet, and Lord Byron in the Lincoln Center production of Tennessee Williams' Camino Real with Al Pacino.

A member of the Motion Picture Academy of Arts and Sciences, Clifford's filmography includes Invitation to a Gunfighter (1964), Resurrection, and M. Night Shyamalan's Signs (2002). As an accomplished pianist, he was cast as Beethoven in Bill & Ted's Excellent Adventure (1989).

A member of the Actors Studio from 1962, David worked with many of the greats of American theater, film, and television. He told stories of drinking with Richard Burton and shopping with Marilyn Monroe. He was working with Monroe on a play entitled The Cat, adapted from a Colette novel by Arthur Miller, when she died.

David was featured in the principal casts and on the original studio albums of such Broadway musicals as Wildcat with Lucille Ball, 1776, with William Daniels, Alan Jay Lerner's On a Clear Day You Can See Forever, and Andrew Lloyd Webber's Joseph and the Amazing Technicolor Dreamcoat.

Other feature film credits include The Last Mile (1959), The Party's Over (1965) with Oliver Reed, Riot (1969), The Betsy (1978), with Laurence Olivier, Fort Apache, The Bronx with Paul Newman (1981), and The Exorcist III (1990).

He was seen on television in the miniseries Blind Ambition, as well as in political dramas Fear on Trial and Missiles of October with Martin Sheen. He appeared in episodes of Bonanza, The Big Valley, Charlie's Angels, Mary Tyler Moore, Murphy Brown, Party of Five, Murder, She Wrote, Will & Grace, and Law & Order.

Filmography

References

External links

Clifford David at Internet Off-Broadway Database
Clifford David at the University of Wisconsin's Actors Studio audio collection

1928 births
2017 deaths
Male actors from Toledo, Ohio
Singers from Ohio